is a passenger railway station in located in the city of Higashiōmi,  Shiga Prefecture, Japan, operated by the private railway operator Ohmi Railway.

Lines
Sakuragawa Station is served by the Ohmi Railway Main Line, and is located 31.2 rail kilometers from the terminus of the line at Maibara Station.

Station layout
The station consists of two unnumbered side platforms connected to the station building by a level crossing. The station building is unattended.

Platforms

Adjacent stations

History
Sakuragawa Station was opened on October 1, 1900.

Passenger statistics
In fiscal 2019, the station was used by an average of 125 passengers daily (boarding passengers only).

Surroundings
 Higashiomi City Gamo Higashi Elementary School
Higashiomi City Gamo Medical Center
 Higashiomi City Hall Gamo Branch

See also
List of railway stations in Japan

References

External links

 Ohmi Railway official site 

Railway stations in Japan opened in 1900
Railway stations in Shiga Prefecture
Higashiōmi